The canton of Villiers-le-Bel is an administrative division of the Val-d'Oise department, Île-de-France region, northern France. Its borders were modified at the French canton reorganisation which came into effect in March 2015. Its seat is in Villiers-le-Bel.

It consists of the following communes:

Bonneuil-en-France
Bouqueval
Gonesse
Roissy-en-France
Le Thillay
Vaudherland
Villiers-le-Bel

References

Cantons of Val-d'Oise